Angelmouse is a British children's television programme which was produced and broadcast by the BBC. It was aired on CBBC and CBeebies (both the separate channel and CBeebies on BBC One and BBC Two). It has also been broadcast on ABC Kids. It started from 27 September 1999 and ended on 31 March 2000.

There are also Angelmouse books and plush toys available in the United Kingdom.

Characters
Angelmouse - A mouse who is an angel. He lives on earth with his friend Quilly, and receives missions to do good deeds from "You-know-who" (God). He has wings and a "thingamajig" (halo), which is loose and can slip, shrink, wobble or even disappear when he misbehaves or neglects his mission. His Thingamajig can also mend things and solve problems.
Quilly the Bird - A talking bird, who gives Angelmouse advice and always prompts him to start or continue his missions. He is also the narrator in each episode.
Elliemum - A sensible, kind and cheerful elephant and the mother of Baby Ellie who highly regards Angelmouse as a 'real angel'.
Baby Ellie - Elliemum's baby elephant, who likes to play and join in the fun.
Oswald - A duck, who loves to speed especially on roller-skates. He often says "No Brakes!" as he whizzes by.
Spencer - A dotty teddy bear, who frequently drives a car.
Little Petal - A cute rag doll, who runs a little shop.
Hutchkin - A rabbit, who stays in his burrow most of the time. 
Other Angels - The angels that live in Heaven and are seen to attend Angel School, a school meant for angels that teach them how to be good, paint rainbows, and go through the pearled Gates of Heaven.
(They made their first appearance in the episode "My Friend Angelmouse")
Angel Teacher - The teacher of all of the angels, he firstly appeared in the episode "My Friend Angelmouse", revealing that he sometimes gets annoyed when Angelmouse makes a mistake.
You-know-who - He is actually God, whom he is referred throughout the series as You-know-who by both Angelmouse and Quilly (and possibly the other characters). He is never shown on screen or has said anything by word (despite that he sends Angelmouse missions by a piece of paper that flies with wings above it) due to that since He is God from the religion Christianity, it is believed that He is not a man, and has no shape or form, and He is a supreme male divine spirit.
(Whenever Angelmouse's Thingamajig disappears when he makes a mistake, it is possible that You-know-who is responsible for taking the Thingamajig away as Angelmouse's punishment for some sort.)
The Weather Angels - 3 angels that often deal with the weather.
-The Sun Angel - He has the sun power of sunlight/daylight.
-The Wind Angel - He has the ability to provide wind by taking a deep breath and blowing the wind out of his mouth.
-The Rain Angel - He has the power to provide rain to Earth.
(Unlike the other angels, the Weather Angels do not have wings, robes, or halos, but are seen as spirits that deal with weather often.)
The Post Angel
- An angel that deals with the Seventh Heaven Newspaper.

Episodes

Releases
VHS:
"My Friend Angelmouse" (1999) - (My Friend Angelmouse, Lost Thingamajig, Windy Weather Day, Trumpet, Baby Ellie's Presents, Angelcake, Copycat Chick, Angelmouse's Day Off, A Visitor For Angelmouse, Angelmouse's Reward)

DVD:
"Angelmouse - The Complete Series" (1999) - (My Friend Angelmouse, Lost Thingamajig, Important Message, Windy Weather Day, Trumpet, Baby Ellie's Presents, Angelcake, Copycat Chick, Night Flight, Cloud Nine, Angelmouse's Day Off, Angelmouse's Reward, Guardian Angelmouse, A Visitor for Angelmouse, The Rainy Day, The Missing Message, Can't Sleep Won't Sleep, Flyaway Feather, Ice Cream Clouds, The Rainbow Paint, Head in the Clouds, The Can't Stop Duck, The Wishing Star, Bouncing Elliemum, Weather Angels, The Missing Skates)
 "Angelmouse: Angelmouse's Reward, A Visitor for Angelmouse and other stories" (2006) - (Angelmouse's Reward, A Visitor for Angelmouse, The Rainy Day, Can't Sleep Won't Sleep, Guardian Angelmouse)

See also
BBC
CBeebies
List of BBC children's television programmes

External links

Angelmouse official website
Mark Mason Animation Ltd. website

1999 British television series debuts
2000 British television series endings
1990s British children's television series
2000s British children's television series
1990s British animated television series
2000s British animated television series
British children's animated comedy television series
English-language television shows
BBC children's television shows
Australian Broadcasting Corporation original programming
Fictional angels
Christian animation
Animated television series about mice and rats
Angels in television
Television characters introduced in 1999
Male characters in television
CBeebies